Solidago leavenworthii, or Leavenworth's goldenrod, is North American species of herbaceous perennial plants of the family Asteraceae. It is native to southeastern United States from Florida north to Georgia and the Carolinas.

Solidago leavenworthii is a perennial herb up to 210 cm (80 inches or 6 2/3 feet) tall, spreading by means of underground rhizomes. Leaves are crowded together, with as many as 80 leaves on one stem, though none gathered around the base of the stalk as in some related species. One plant can produce as many as 350 small yellow flower heads in a tall, branching array at the top of the plant.

See also

References

Plants described in 1842
Flora of the Southeastern United States
leavenworthii
Flora without expected TNC conservation status